The Mahzor of Worms is a thirteenth century illuminated manuscript. It is a Mahzor, a Jewish prayerbook, and the locus of the first written Yiddish.

References

External links
Machzor Worms in the catalog of the National Library of Israel, including a full scan.

13th-century illuminated manuscripts
Jewish prayer books
Yiddish-language literature